Buch is the surname of:

 Bob Buch (born 1949), member of the Alaska House of Representatives
 Claudia-Maria Buch (born 1966), German economist
 Christian Leopold von Buch (1774–1853), German geologist and paleontologist
 Tomás Buch (1931–2017), Argentine chemist and technologist
 Eva-Maria Buch (1921–1943), German resistance fighter
 Walter Buch (1883–1949), German jurist and war criminal

See also
 Captal de Buch, including Jean III de Grailly, captal de Buch